Vanessa Morgan Mziray (born March 23, 1992), known professionally as Vanessa Morgan, is a Canadian actress. She is known for her roles as Beatrix "Bird" Castro in the MTV teen drama series Finding Carter, as Amanda Pierce in the Family teen comedy series The Latest Buzz, and as Sarah in the Disney Channel / Teletoon film My Babysitter's a Vampire and the television series of the same name. Since 2017, she has portrayed Toni Topaz in The CW teen drama series Riverdale.

Early life
Morgan was born in Ottawa, Ontario. Her mother is Scottish and her father is Tanzanian. Morgan is the youngest of three children. She has two older siblings: an older sister and an older brother. Morgan began singing at the age of six. She sang at community events and telethons, performed for Childhelp, and was a regular guest entertainer for the College of the Desert scholarship foundation. She was spotted by a Hollywood agent in 1999 and earned a scholarship at a Hollywood acting academy. In 1999, Morgan won the Junior Miss America pageant and won first place vocalist at the National Date Festival. In 2000, she won first place in the African-American Vocal Competition. In her early life, she was a member of the competitive NTA tennis program at the Ottawa Athletic Club. Morgan graduated from Colonel By Secondary School in 2010 and studied philosophy at Queen's University.

Career

Acting
Morgan made her acting debut in the VH1 film A Diva's Christmas Carol in 2000 and another appearance in the film Frankie & Alice in 2010. She became known in 2007 for her role as Amanda Pearce in the Family teen comedy series The Latest Buzz as well as performing the theme song for the series. She also played Marion Hawthorne in the 2010 Disney Channel film Harriet the Spy: Blog Wars.

The following year, Morgan played Sarah in the Teletoon / Disney Channel film My Babysitter's a Vampire, as well in the television series of the same name. Morgan also appeared in the 2011 Disney Channel film Geek Charming. She had a recurring role in season 2 of the Disney Channel comedy series A.N.T. Farm for four episodes.

In 2013, Morgan appeared on Degrassi: The Next Generation for two episodes.

In 2014, Morgan had a recurring role on the MTV show Finding Carter, playing Beatrix "Bird" Castro.

In 2017, she joined the main cast of the fantasy drama series The Shannara Chronicles as Lyria for the second season on Spike. Morgan was then cast in the recurring role of Toni Topaz in The CW teen drama series Riverdale. On May 2, 2018, it was announced that Morgan would be a series regular for the show's third season.

Other work
Morgan competed in the first season of the CTV reality competition series The Amazing Race Canada with her sister, Celina Mziray. They finished the race in third place.

Personal life 
On July 3, 2019, Morgan became engaged to professional baseball player Michael Kopech. They were married on January 4, 2020. On June 19, 2020, Kopech filed for divorce. On July 24, 2020, Morgan announced she was pregnant. As of December 2020, the divorce case was pending. In 2021, Morgan gave birth to a son.

Filmography

Discography

Awards and nominations

Notes

References

External links

 
 
 Cast bios for Geek Charming – Vanessa Morgan "Hannah" @ Disney Channel Medianet (October 2011 archive copy)

1992 births
21st-century Canadian actresses
Actresses from Ottawa
Black Canadian actresses
Canadian child actresses
Canadian film actresses
Canadian people of Scottish descent
Canadian people of Tanzanian descent
Canadian television actresses
Living people
The Amazing Race Canada contestants